Jiří Jelínek may refer to:

Jiří Jelínek (trumpeter) (1922–1984), Czech painter, illustrator, jazz trumpeter, and popular singer
Jiří Jelínek (ballet dancer) (born 1977), Czech ballet dancer
Jiří Jelínek (ice hockey) (born 1979), Czech professional ice hockey defenceman

See also
Jiří (disambiguation)
Jelinek